Sabine Eichenberger (born 25 September 1968) is a Swiss sprint canoer who competed in the mid-1990s. She won a silver medal in the K-4 500 m event at the 1996 Summer Olympics in Atlanta.

References
 DatabaseOlympics.com profile
 Sports-Reference.com profile

1968 births
Canoeists at the 1996 Summer Olympics
Living people
Olympic canoeists of Switzerland
Olympic silver medalists for Switzerland
Swiss female canoeists
Olympic medalists in canoeing
Medalists at the 1996 Summer Olympics